The Iligan Steel Mill was a steelworks in Iligan, Philippines. At one point during its operation, it was considered as the largest steel mill in Asia.

History 
The Iligan Steel Mill was established in 1952 as a government-initiated project of the National Shipyards and Steel Corporation (NASSCO).

After NASSCO applied for a $62.3 million loan from the United States-based Eximbank to fund projects, the latter suggested a transfer of the facilities' management to the private entity. The company was sold in 1963 to Iligan Integrated Steel Mills, Inc. of the Jacinto family.

In 1974, NASSCO assets were absorbed by newly incorporated National Steel Corporation. NSC was later acquired by Wing Tiek of the Malaysian Westmont Group in 1995.

NSC was severely affected by the 1997 Asian financial crisis which caused it to be unable to counter the dumping of cheap imported steel in the Philippine market. In 2000, the government ordered for NSC's liquidation.

The Iligan Steel Mill was acquired in 2004 by Ispat Industries Ltd of India. The company faced financial and labor issues, which led to the facility's closure in 2009.

The city government of Iligan has attempted to auction off the 400-hectare steel mill in 2016 but there were no interested bidders. The properties associated with the steel mill were then forfeited to the Iligan city government.

Revival 
SteelAsia has offered to acquire NSC's steel mill in Iligan. The local government of Iligan is also attempting to reopen the defunct steel mill.

References 

Iron and steel mills of the Philippines
1952 establishments in the Philippines
Iligan